Mercurial World is the debut studio album by American synthpop duo Magdalena Bay, released on October 8, 2021 through Luminelle Recordings and The Orchard. The album received widespread acclaim from critics. A 28-track deluxe edition was released on September 23, 2022.

Composition 
Mercurial World is a synth-pop and electronic pop album, with elements of disco, pop rock, electronica, shoegaze, EDM, vaporwave, noise pop, chiptune, progressive house, sophisti-pop, yacht-pop, and psychedelic music. The album's instrumentation consists of "funk guitar, bouncing disco piano, and every texture and tone of synth imaginable."

Critical reception 
Mercurial World received a score of 78 out of 100 on review aggregate site Metacritic, based on eight critical reviews, indicating "generally favorable reviews". Matt Collar of AllMusic described band member Mica Tennenbaum's vocals as "cherubic croon", comparing it to Kate Bush, Madonna, and Minnie Riperton. Katherine St. Asaph, writing for Pitchfork commended the album's sequencing, with its "gentle dissolves and impeccably timed key and tempo changes", but criticized its lyrics as "unadorned afterthoughts". Exclaim! writer Kaelen Bell called Mercurial World "a big album from small places, one that revels in the protean nature of the internet and sees the possibilities for reinvention that still exist there."

Under the Radar writer Caleb Cambell praised the album highly, saying "Magdalena Bay are quite simply talented pop songsmiths. Their debut is first and foremost a smartly crafted record, full of irresistible melodic hooks and detailed production. The results are all-enveloping and mesmerizing, crafting a glittery pop landscape with plenty of layers to uncover and unexpected new territory to explore with each listen".

Year-end lists

Track listing

Personnel 
Magdalena Bay
 Matthew Lewin – writing, production, engineering, mixing, mastering
 Mica Tenenbaum – vocals, writing, production

Musicians
 Giacomo Cazzaro – saxophone
 Louie Diller – drums
 Juan Ignacia Varela – saxophone
 Nick Villa – drums

Art
 Max Taeuschel – layout
 Ram Han – artwork

Charts

References 

2021 debut albums
Magdalena Bay (group) albums
Dream pop albums by American artists
The Orchard (company) albums